Muhammad Syaahir bin Saiful Nizam is a Malaysian footballer who plays as a forward for Malaysia Super League club Sri Pahang.

References

External links
 

Living people
Sri Pahang FC players
Malaysian footballers
Malaysian people of Malay descent
Malaysia Super League players
Association football forwards

Year of birth missing (living people)